The Croker Group is a group of islands in the Arafura Sea. The group lies offshore from Cobourg Peninsula, and is part of the Northern Territory of Australia. The group is Aboriginal freehold land, held by the Arnhem Land Aboriginal Land Trust.

The group consists of at least 12 named islands, and a number of small unnamed islands and rocks. By far the largest island of the group is Croker Island, which has an area of 331 km2. Croker Island is also the only permanently inhabited island in the group. None of the other islands in the group is larger than 15 km2.

List of Islands

See also
List of islands of Australia

References

Islands of the Northern Territory